is a Quasi-National Park in Nara, Ōsaka, and Wakayama Prefectures, Japan. It was established in 1958.

Places of interest

Related municipalities
 Nara: Gojō, Gose, Heguri, Ikoma, Kashiba, Katsuragi, Sangō
 Ōsaka: Izumi, Izumisano, Kaizuka, Kawachinagano, Kishiwada, Sennan (incomplete)
 Wakayama: Hashimoto, Katsuragi, Kinokawa

See also
 List of national parks of Japan

References

External links
 
  Map of the parks of Nara Prefecture
  Map of the parks of Wakayama Prefecture

National parks of Japan
Parks and gardens in Osaka Prefecture
Parks and gardens in Nara Prefecture
Protected areas established in 1958